Krapkowice is a town in southern Poland with 16,301 inhabitants (2019), situated in the Opole Voivodeship, straddling both banks of the Oder River at the point where it joins with the Osobłoga. It is the regional capital of Krapkowice County.

Traditionally this Upper Silesian town was a centre for leather, paper and cement manufacturing. Today only the paper and leather industries remain. For example, in Krapkowice the toilet paper brand Mola is produced by a major job provider, Metsä.

Notable people
Mikuláš Albert z Kaménka (c.1547–1617), Czech priest and translator
Wilhelm Alexander Freund (1833–1917)
Ottomar Rosenbach (1851–1907), German physician
Hertha Pohl (1889–1954), writer
Krzysztof Zwoliński (born 1959), Polish athlete
Alice Bota (born 1979), Polish-German journalist

Twin towns – sister cities
See twin towns of Gmina Krapkowice.

References

External links
 Official town webpage
 KRAPKOWICE.net - Portal of Krapkowice County 
 KRAPKOWICE.NET.PL - Krapkowicki Weekly 
 Jewish Community in Krapkowice on Virtual Shtetl

Cities in Silesia
Shtetls
Cities and towns in Opole Voivodeship
Krapkowice County